Kurt Leichtweiß (March 2, 1927 in Villingen-Schwenningen – June 23, 2013) was a mathematician specializing in convex and differential geometry.

In 1944, while still in high school Leichtweiß traveled to the Oberwolfach Research Institute for Mathematics where his mathematical interests were encouraged.  He studied at the University of Freiburg and the ETH Zurich. He was a student of Emanuel Sperner and Wilhelm Süss.  He was then a lecturer in Freiburg and in 1963 became a professor at TU Berlin. From 1970 until his retirement in 1995, he was a professor at the University of Stuttgart.

Books 

 (with Wilhelm Blaschke), Elementary Differential Geometry, Springer, 1973.
 Affine geometry of convex bodies, Wiley, 1998.
 Convex Geometry, Springer, 1980.
 Analytic Geometry, First Course, Teubner, 1972.

References

External links 
 Prof. Dr. Kurt Leichtweiss, contact page.

1927 births
2013 deaths
People from Villingen-Schwenningen
People from the Republic of Baden
20th-century German mathematicians
21st-century German mathematicians
Geometers
University of Freiburg alumni
Academic staff of the University of Freiburg
ETH Zurich alumni
Academic staff of the Technical University of Berlin